"I Want You (She's So Heavy)" is the sixteenth episode of the thirtieth season of the American animated television series The Simpsons, and the 655th episode overall. It aired in the United States on Fox on March 10, 2019. This episode was dedicated to Luke Perry who died on March 4, 2019, and previously guest-starred as himself in the fourth season episode "Krusty Gets Kancelled."

The title of this episode is taken from the Beatles' song "I Want You (She's So Heavy)."

Plot
Marge and Homer are compelled to go to Drug and Alcohol Night of Knowledge (D.A.N.K.) and hire Shauna Chalmers to babysit, but her boyfriend Jimbo Jones sneaks into the house. Lisa and Maggie are traumatized by the horror movies Jimbo is playing, while Bart is mesmerized by Jimbo and Shauna making out. The kids go for a walk, and the babysitters throw a house party. Ned Flanders sees the kids and invites them over for a mug of hot coconut milk.

Bored with the D.A.N.K. seminar, Homer and Marge sneak out, but in the hallway are enticed to sneak into the Springfield Wedding Expo using stolen name tags. Posing as Dr. and Mrs. Heffernen, the two improvise the expo's keynote speech, "Next Year's Wedding Trends", and find themselves in bliss because of their time together at the expo. The mood is almost soured when the two return home to find the house party still in process. After clearing out the intruders, Homer, still feeling romantic, attempts to carry Marge upstairs, but ends up falling down the stairs in pain, spraining Marge's ankle. At the hospital, Homer finds out he has developed an inguinal hernia. Back at home, side effects of the medication makes him hallucinate that his hernia, now named Wallace (Wallace Shawn), is talking to him in the form of a small man. The next day, at Springfield Physical Therapy, Marge gets trained by a New Zealand therapist named Nigel who talks her into learning kite-surfing. Wallace the hernia convinces Homer to blow off exercising, as well as a trip to the beach with Marge, causing a rift.

The next day, Marge is visibly disappointed when Homer uses his injury to get out of babysitting. Meanwhile, in the park, Lisa, with no other couple to turn to, asks Jimbo and Shauna for advice, who tell her the parents should find common interests. Back at home, Lisa persuades Homer to drive the kids to the beach for her "school project", while Maggie, who can see and hear Wallace, slaps the animated hernia. At the beach Homer recoils at how overweight Chief Wiggum is, and decides to join Marge kite-surfing, where they reconcile, but the wind blows their kites into a wind farm where they get new injuries.

At the Springfield Police Station, Marge finds out from Wiggum that Nigel is really a Russian spy named Dimitri, who was attempting to spy on Homer and Springfield's nuclear power plant. Wiggum and the Federal agents arrest Dimitri.

In the epilogue, a trailer for a spy movie, Mission: Simpossible, that also stars Wallace the Hernia as a pastiche of "Theme from Mission: Impossible" plays.

Reception
Dennis Perkins of The A.V. Club gave the episode a D, stating, "This episode is nothing. It barely exists. It’s a disconnected heap of shells of older plots and ideas and character beats without an original thought or gag to enliven a single one."

"I Want You (She's so Heavy)" scored a 0.8 rating with a 4 share and was watched by 2.21 million people, making The Simpsons Fox's second highest rated show of the night, behind Family Guy.

References

The Simpsons (season 30) episodes
2019 American television episodes
LGBT-related animated television episodes